Aleksandra Đanković (born 8 November 1987) is a Serbian politician. She has been a member of the Assembly of Vojvodina since 2016, serving as one of its vice-presidents (i.e., deputy speakers) throughout that time. She was also briefly a member of the National Assembly of Serbia after the 2022 parliamentary election. Đanković is a member of the Socialist Party of Serbia (Socijalistička partija Srbije, SPS).

Early life and private career
Đanković was born in Novi Sad, in what was then the Socialist Autonomous Province of Vojvodina in the Socialist Republic of Serbia, Socialist Federal Republic of Yugoslavia. She was raised there and in the village of Ravno Selo in the nearby municipality of Vrbas. She earned a bachelor's degree from the faculty of economics at the University of Novi Sad (Subotica branch) in 2009 and received a master's degree from the same institution in 2015.

She worked at Srbijagas from 2009 to 2013, initially as an intern and later as a financial associate in the office of the general manager. She was employed by South Stream in Novi Sad from 2013 to 2015 before returning to work at Srbijagas, where she has been active with the Turkish Stream project as head of the department in the financial service.

Politician

Member of the Assembly of Vojvodina
Đanković appeared in the sixth position on the Socialist Party's electoral list in the 2016 Vojvodina provincial election and was elected when the list won twelve mandates. The Socialists took part in a coalition government led by the Serbian Progressive Party (Srpska napredna stranka, SNS) after the election, and she served as a government supporter. By convention, all major parties represented in the legislature are allowed to nominate one deputy speaker; Đanković was the SPS's nominee and was elected to the position on 2 June 2016. In her first term, she was also president of the committee for economy.

She was promoted to the third position on the SPS list in the 2020 provincial election and was re-elected when the list won thirteen mandates. The party continued to serve in Vojvodina's government after the election, and she was confirmed for a second term as assembly vice-president. Đanković is also a member of the committee on budget and finance, the committee on European integration and interregional cooperation, and the committee on co-operation with committees of the national assembly in exercising the competences of the province.

Politics at the republic level
Đanković received the 120th position on the SPS's list in the 2020 Serbian parliamentary election, which took place concurrently with the provincial election. The list won thirty-two seats, and she was not elected.

For the 2022 parliamentary election, she was promoted to the fifth position on the party's list. This was tantamount to election, and she was indeed elected when the list won thirty-one seats. When the assembly convened, she was appointed as a member of the culture and information committee, a deputy member of the foreign affairs committee, and a deputy member of the committee on administrative, budgetary, mandate, and immunity issues.

Under Serbian law, Đanković could not serve a dual mandate in the national and provincial assemblies. She resigned her seat in the national assembly on 2 September 2022.

References

1987 births
Living people
People from Novi Sad
Members of the Assembly of Vojvodina
Socialist Party of Serbia politicians
Members of the National Assembly (Serbia)
Women members of the National Assembly (Serbia)